Marion Township is one of thirteen townships in Owen County, Indiana, United States. As of the 2010 census, its population was 916 and it contained 464 housing units.

History
Marion Township was founded in 1835.

Geography

Unincorporated towns
 Denmark at 
 Hickory Corner at 
 Marion Mills at 
 Patricksburg at 
 Smithville at 
(This list is based on USGS data and may include former settlements.)

Cemeteries
The township contains these eight cemeteries: Burger Cemetery, Humble Cemetery (an Indiana Pioneer Cemetery,) Marion Cemetery, Mast Cemetery, Rea Cemetery, Red Brush Cemetery, Stephens Cemetery and Steubenville Cemetery.

School districts
 Spencer-Owen Community Schools

Political districts
 US House District 8th
 State House District 46
 State Senate District 39

References
 
 United States Census Bureau 2009 TIGER/Line Shapefiles
 IndianaMap

External links
 Indiana Township Association
 United Township Association of Indiana
 City-Data.com page for Marion Township

Townships in Owen County, Indiana
Townships in Indiana